Rocksprings Independent School District is a public school district based in Rocksprings, Texas (USA) and located in Edwards County, with a very small portion of the district extending into Val Verde County.

Rocksprings ISD has two campuses -

Rocksprings High School (Grades 9-12)
Rocksprings Elementary/Junior High School (Grades PK-8).

On April 30, 1985, the Carta Valley Independent School District merged into Rocksprings ISD.

In 2009, the school district was rated "academically acceptable" by the Texas Education Agency.

References

External links
Rocksprings ISD

School districts in Edwards County, Texas
School districts in Val Verde County, Texas